Clifton is a historic home and farm located near Rixeyville, Culpeper County, Virginia. It was built about 1845, and is a two-story frame dwelling, built in the Greek Revival style, with wings constructed about 1850 and about 1910.  Also on the property is a "street" of contributing outbuildings dated to the 19th and early 20th centuries.  They include an antebellum two-story frame kitchen with a wide stone chimney; a 19th-century frame bank barn; a stone ash house, an icehouse, a chicken house, and a small frame barn, all built around 1918; a frame chicken house constructed about 1950; and a large center-aisle frame corncrib and spring house built about 1930.

It was listed on the National Register of Historic Places in 2008.

References

Houses on the National Register of Historic Places in Virginia
Farms on the National Register of Historic Places in Virginia
Greek Revival houses in Virginia
Houses completed in 1845
Houses in Culpeper County, Virginia
National Register of Historic Places in Culpeper County, Virginia